The Royal Australasian College of Dental Surgeons (RACDS) is a postgraduate professional education body established in 1965 to provide a broad range of activities to enhance the professional development of both general and specialist dentists through individually actioned studies and examinations leading to Membership or Fellowship of the College. RACDS provides ongoing professional development, mentoring and networking opportunities to its thousand of candidates, Fellows and Members. While it is a global organisation, its headquarters are in the Sydney CBD in Sydney, Australia.

RACDS was established to promote high standards of postgraduate education in the dental profession, and to recognise both general and specialist dentists who have undertaken postgraduate training. Successful completion of college examinations provides RACDS candidates with Membership or Fellowship with the College, and as such allows the use of prestigious post-nominals (MRACDS or FRACDS).

Membership or Fellowship is awarded in the following disciplines:

1. General Dental Practice.

2. Specialist Dental Practice - Dental Public Health, Endodontics, Orthodontics, Periodontics, Dento-Maxillofacial Radiology, Oral Medicine, Paediatric Dentistry and Prosthodontics.

3. Oral & Maxillofacial Surgery

Key Personnel
 Dr Susan Wise, President 2022 - 2024
 Brendan Peek, Chief Executive Officer

Patronage
 Her Excellency The Rt Honourable Dame Patsy Reddy, Governor-General of New Zealand.

See also

List of Australian organisations with royal patronage

References

External links

Dental Axess Site

Dental organizations
Royal colleges
Organisations based in Australia with royal patronage
1965 establishments in Australia
Medical associations based in Australia
Specialist medical colleges in Australia
Dentistry in Australia